Anton the Magician is a 1978 East German comedy film directed by Günter Reisch. It was entered into the 11th Moscow International Film Festival where Ulrich Thein won the award for Best Actor.

Cast
 Ulrich Thein as Anton
 Anna Dymna as Liesel
 Erwin Geschonneck as Vater Grubske
 Barbara Dittus as Sabine
 Marina Krogull as Ilie
 Erik S. Klein as Schröder
 Marianne Wünscher as Rechtsanwältin
 Jessy Rameik as Bürgermeisterin
 Ralph Borgwardt as Leiter der Haftanstalt
 Gerry Wolff as Oberwachtmeister
 Werner Godemann as Franz Rostig
 Grigore Grigoriu as Sergeant (as Grigori Grigoriu)
 Dezsö Garas as Istvan

References

External links
 

1978 films
1978 comedy films
East German films
German comedy films
1970s German-language films
Films directed by Günter Reisch
1970s German films